Otto VIII may refer to:

 Count Otto VIII of Wittelsbach, killed in 1209, son of Count Otto VII of Wittelsbach and murderer of king Philip of Swabia
 Otto VIII, Count of Bentheim-Tecklenburg, a state leader in 1499–1514
 Otto VIII, Count of Hoya (1530–1582), the last ruling Count of Hoya 1563–1582

See also 
 Otto I (disambiguation)
 Otto II (disambiguation)
 Otto III (disambiguation)
 Otto IV (disambiguation)
 Otto V (disambiguation)
 Otto VI
 Otto VII (disambiguation)